Pierre-Louis (1917–1987) was a French film actor. He also directed three films in the early 1950s including The Nude Dancer.

Selected filmography

Actor
 Madame Angot's Daughter (1935)
 Hélène (1936)
 The Mysteries of Paris (1943)
 Box of Dreams (1945)
 Counter Investigation (1947)
 Quay of Grenelle (1950)
 Sins of Madeleine (1951)
 Folie douce (1951)
 Moumou (1951)
 Fortuné de Marseille (1952)
 His Father's Portrait (1953)
 Tourbillon (1953)
 Burning Fuse (1957)
 Anyone Can Kill Me (1957)
 Maigret Sets a Trap (1958)

Director
 The Nude Dancer (1952)
 Soyez les bienvenus (1953)
 Mandat d'amener (1953)

References

Bibliography
 Goble, Alan. The Complete Index to Literary Sources in Film. Walter de Gruyter, 1999.

External links

1917 births
1987 deaths
French film directors
French male film actors
People from Le Mans